The USS Ticonderoga was a schooner which served in the United States Navy from 1814 to 1825. The first vessel in navy service by that name, she was built as a merchant steamer in 1814 at Vergennes, Vermont, purchased by the Navy at Lake Champlain, converted to a schooner, and relaunched on 12 May 1814.

Service history
Ticonderoga served with Captain Thomas Macdonough's squadron during the Battle of Plattsburgh on 11 September 1814. Commanded by Lt. Stephen Cassin, Ticonderoga compelled sloop HMS Chubb (formerly ) to surrender after riddling her with shot and forcing her aground. She also assisted in the capture of sloop HMS Finch (formerly ), and repelled several boarding attempts by British gunboats. Midshipman Hiram Paulding was on board Ticonderoga during the battle and used his pistol to discharge a cannon when firing matches proved defective. During the two-and-one-half-hour engagement, six members of Ticonderogas crew were killed, and six others were wounded.

After the war, Ticonderoga was laid up at Whitehall, New York. A decade later, she was pronounced unworthy of repair and sold at public sale on 19 July 1825.

She was rediscovered in 1958, raised and "salvaged" the next year; the wooden remains of this historic vessel are now on public display in Whitehall, New York.

Bibliography
 Url
 Url

References

Steamships of the United States Navy